The 1907 Western State Normal Hilltoppers football team represented Western State Normal School (later renamed Western Michigan University) as an independent during the 1907 college football season.  In their first season under head coach William H. Spaulding, the Hilltoppers compiled a 4–2–1 record and shut out five of seven opponents.

After losing to Albion (0–5) and Olivet (0–3), the team did not allow a point to be scored by its opponents in the final four games against Central Normal (29–0), Ferris State (0–0), Michigan State Normal (6–0), and Kalamazoo (40–0).

Halfback Tubby Meyers was the team captain for the second of three consecutive years.

The 1907 season marked the beginning of a 15-year tenure by William H. Spaulding as the school's head football coach.  Spalding had played college football at Wabash College in 1906. He coached the Western State football team from 1907 to 1921, compiling a 62–25–3 record, and later served as head football coach at Minnesota (1922–1924) and UCLA (1925–1938).

Schedule

References

Western State Normal
Western Michigan Broncos football seasons
Western State Normal Hilltoppers football